Cambus is an American public transport bus system, primarily serving the University of Iowa campus in Iowa City, Iowa. The service is intended to provide transportation for students, faculty, and staff around the main campus, University of Iowa Research Park, residence halls, and commuter parking lots. Cambus is a no-fare service open to the general public, and provides approximately 4,500,000 rides per year. It is one of three transit systems in the Iowa City area, the other two being Iowa City Transit and Coralville Transit, and Cambus shares several stops with them.

The service is operated by the Department of Parking and Transportation for the University of Iowa with funding from the Parking & Transportation Department, a UI Student fee, and the Federal Transportation Administration. Cambus employs approximately 170 employees. There are only six non-student employees who work specifically for Cambus: the Cambus Manager, the Maintenance Supervisor, and four full-time mechanics. All other employees, including drivers, dispatchers, trainers, student mechanics, and departmental supervisors, are students currently enrolled at the University of Iowa.

Cambus also has two different buildings on the University of Iowa campus. The main office is located on Evashevski Drive, north Kinnick Stadium, called the West Campus Transportation Center.  Cambus moved operations to this newer building, shared with the Parking & Transportation department, on November 16, 2012. The Cambus Maintenance Facility, often called "The Barn" by employees, is located on South Madison Street south of the Campus Recreation and Wellness Center.

History 
Cambus was founded by University of Iowa students and has been in operation since March 1972. The name "Cambus" was the result of a naming contest. It started with seven vehicles dating from 1955 and 1956. By 1975, the fleet had grown to 11 vehicles. Twelve new buses were purchased the following year. In 2004, the fleet had 32 vehicles. The University of Iowa campus is divided into east and west halves by the Iowa River. Most Liberal Arts and Sciences classes take place on the east side of the river; thus the purpose of the new bus service was to facilitate easier transportation between the west-side dormitories and the east-side classrooms. At first there was no name for this service, so the founding students created a contest open to all U of I students to select one. "Cambus" was the name eventually chosen after Cambuskenneth, and the winner, Larry Page, was awarded a free pizza.

The first Cambus buses were used school buses, repainted by Cambus employees. There were three different bus routes; Red Route, Blue Route, and the Interdorm Shuttle. Cambus also acquired a trailer, which was used as their main office; this was located in the Hancher Auditorium parking lot.

In the 2013 financial year, ridership reached 4.5 million.

In October, 2018, Cambus routes and schedules were integrated with Google Maps.

Routes 
Cambus currently has thirteen routes in service.

During Academic service (the Spring and Fall semesters), all routes run on weekdays with limited service on the weekends. During Summer and Interim service a limited service runs without any weekend service. Route maps and schedules are available on the Cambus website and in pamphlets available on the buses. Cambus time is set by the Master Clock at the US Naval Observatory. 

During academic service the earliest route begins at 4:30 am and the last route ends at 1:02 am (2:12 am on Friday and Saturday nights for SafeRide)

Cambus also provides special service for university-affiliated groups, including shuttle service for most Hawkeye football games (to/from downtown, Hancher, and the Hawkeye Commuter Lot), men's Hawkeye basketball games (to/from Hancher), and other events on campus.

Following a recommendation from the Iowa City Area Transit Study (ICATS), Cambus began using route numbers in July 2021.

Route list

Bus tracking 
Live bus tracking using GPS was introduced in 2010 with the BONGO (Bus on the Go) service. This was replaced in December 2019 with bus tracking in the Transit app.

Bionic Bus 
In accordance with the Americans with Disabilities Act (ADA), Cambus provides paratransit service called the Bionic Bus for University staff, faculty, and students. There are up to 3 paratransit buses in service during normal academic service (fewer run on weekends and during interim service). The service is demand-response curb-to-curb and serves much of Iowa City and Coralville. Student drivers are specially trained for Bionic Bus. Unlike Iowa City Transit and Coralville Transit, the paratransit service is handled in-house and not contracted to Johnson County SEATS.

Fleet

See also
List of intercity bus stops in Iowa

References

External links
 Cambus Home Page at the University of Iowa

Bus transportation in Iowa
University and college bus systems
University of Iowa
Transportation in Johnson County, Iowa
1972 establishments in Iowa